Republic Bank (Guyana) Limited was formed in 1836 as the British Guiana Bank, which was the first commercial bank in British Guiana, now Guyana.

References

External links
Official website

Banks of Guyana
Companies of Guyana
1836 establishments in South America